The Zastava M77 is a 7.62x51mm semi-auto rifle developed and manufactured by Zastava Arms. It is a Kalashnikov pattern rifle

Overview
The Zastava M77 rifle chambers and fires the 7.62×51mm NATO round. It is gas-operated, air-cooled, magazine-fed, selective fire light machine gun with either a fixed or a folding stock. It has an adjustable gas system with 3 settings aiding suppressor use.

Between 2014 and 2015 a variant of this rifle was imported into the United States as the M77PS. It is a semi automatic version of the M77 with a polymer thumbhole stock and a 10-round magazine.

Accessories
Bayonet with scabbard
Blank-firing adaptor
Cleaning kit
Oil can
Cleaning rod
Sling
4 spare 20rd magazines

References

External links
M77 - Zastava arms official website

Light machine guns
M77
7.62×51mm NATO machine guns
Zastava Arms
Kalashnikov derivatives